Victoria Mamnguqsualuk (sometimes Mamnguksualuk) (1930-2016) was one of the best-known Canadian Inuit artists of her generation.

Early life 
Born near Garry Lake, Mamnguqsualuk passed a nomadic youth until her thirties, when in 1963, to avoid starvation, her family moved to Baker Lake. Mamnguqsualuk is one of noted Inuit artist Jessie Oonark's eight artistically gifted children; among her siblings are the artists Nancy Pukingrnak, Josiah Nuilaalik, Janet Kigusiuq, Mary Yuusipik Singaqti, Miriam Nanurluk, and William Noah. Her husband, Samson Kayuryuk, and son, Paul Aglakuaq Kayuryuk, are also artists.

Work 
She is best known for her silkscreen and stencil, prints, but has worked in sculpture, drawings, and fabrics as well.  Mamnguqsualuk's bold depictions of Inuit myth have been widely praised.  Like her mother, she moves easily between the realms of graphic arts and textiles. Eight of her prints were part of the first print edition from Baker Lake, in 1970, and her pieces have appeared in many collections since then. Her work is informed by some of the stylistic tropes of European art. In her painting Shaman Caribou, Mamnguqsualuk has created a complex composition that illustrates many aspects of the Inuit Shaman's world.

Collections
Mamnguqsualuk's work is in the collections of:
 the Winnipeg Art Gallery,
 the Canadian Museum of Civilization, 
 the Macdonald Stewart Art Centre, 
 the McMichael Collection, 
 the National Gallery of Canada, and 
 the Glenbow Museum.

References

1930 births
2016 deaths
Canadian printmakers
Women printmakers
Inuit printmakers
20th-century Canadian artists
20th-century printmakers
20th-century Canadian women artists
21st-century Canadian artists
21st-century printmakers
21st-century Canadian women artists
People from Baker Lake
Canadian Inuit women
Artists from Nunavut
Inuit from the Northwest Territories
Inuit from Nunavut
Oonark family